Amir Salar-e Olya (also Romanized as Amīr Sālār-e ‘Olyā) is a village in Par Zeytun Rural District, Meymand District, Firuzabad County, Fars Province, Iran. At the 2006 census, its population was 1,130, in 202 families.

References 

Populated places in Firuzabad County